Sultana Tarun is a Bangladesh Awami League politician and the former Member of Parliament from Kushtia-4.

Career
Tarun was elected to Parliament in 2008 from Kushtia-4 as a Bangladesh Awami League candidate. She is the widow of former Awami League Member of Parliament Abul Hossain Tarun. She was member of the Parliamentary Standing Committee on Ministry of Women and Children Affairs.

References

Awami League politicians
9th Jatiya Sangsad members
1955 births
Living people